Ravenna Township may refer to:

 Ravenna Township, Michigan
 Ravenna Township, Dakota County, Minnesota
 Ravenna Township, Portage County, Ohio
 Ravenna Township, Sanborn County, South Dakota, in Sanborn County, South Dakota

Township name disambiguation pages